Park Min-woo is the name of:

 Park Min-woo (actor) (born 1988), South Korean actor
 Park Min-woo (baseball) (born 1993), South Korean baseball player